SMS Holdings Corporation is a holding company for several companies which provide services to multiple industries including healthcare, hospitality, retail, sports & entertainment, transportation and aviation. The headquarters are located in Nashville, Tennessee.

Companies
 FirstLine Transportation Security, Former TSA partner operating screening checkpoints at Kansas City International Airport (Contract under Akal Security since 2015)
 PrimeFlight Aviation Services, aviation support services
 Service Management Systems, a housekeeping and maintenance company, operating in healthcare, hospitality, retail, sports & leisure and airports
Block by Block, specializing in providing "clean and safe" ambassadors and programs for Downtown Improvement Districts
 ServiceWear Apparel, provider of apparel and uniforms to state, city, county and local government agencies and municipalities

External links
 SMS Holdings
 FirstLine
 PrimeFlight
 Service Management Systems

Companies based in Nashville, Tennessee
Holding companies established in 1988
Service companies of the United States
1988 establishments in Tennessee
American companies established in 1988